Janet Anne Sawbridge  (1947 – 5 March 2021) was a British ice dancer and figure skating coach. Partnered with David Hickinbottom, she won bronze at the 1964 World Figure Skating Championships and silver at the 1965 World Figure Skating Championships. Partnered with Jon Lane, she won bronze at the 1968 World Figure Skating Championships. As a coach, she was known for pairing Jayne Torvill and Christopher Dean (Torvill and Dean).

Competitive highlights

With David Hickinbottom

With Jon Lane

With Peter Dalby

References 

1947 births
2021 deaths
British female ice dancers
Members of the Order of the British Empire